St. Paul's Episcopal Church is a historic church in Franklin, Tennessee, that was listed on the National Register of Historic Places in 1972. In 1988, a National Register study of Williamson County historical resources described it as "one of the finest remaining" Gothic Revival style churches in middle Tennessee. The building was completed in 1834.

It is included in the Hincheyville Historic District, also listed on the National Register. St. Paul's is a parish of the Episcopal Diocese of Tennessee, in fact the diocese's (and state's) oldest congregation.

See also
Owen Chapel Church of Christ, the only antebellum brick church in the county, outside of Franklin, that survives with historic integrity

References

External links
 

Churches on the National Register of Historic Places in Tennessee
Churches completed in 1831
19th-century Episcopal church buildings
Churches in Williamson County, Tennessee
Episcopal churches in Tennessee
Buildings and structures in Franklin, Tennessee
National Register of Historic Places in Williamson County, Tennessee